Khomsianeh may refer to:

Khomsianeh
Khomsianeh-ye Musaabad
Khomsianeh-ye Pain
Khomsianeh-ye Rish Sefid